Auble is a surname, and an Americanized variant of Aubel. Notable people with the surname include:

David Auble (born 1938), American wrestler
Walter H. Auble (1862–1908), American police chief

References

Americanized surnames